The Skirball Cultural Center, founded in 1996, is a Jewish educational institution in Los Angeles, California. The center, named after philanthropist-couple Jack H. Skirball and Audrey Skirball-Kenis, has a museum with regularly changing exhibitions, film events, music and theater performances, comedy, family, literary and cultural programs. The campus includes a museum, a performing arts center, conference halls, classrooms, libraries, courtyards, gardens, and a café. Although the center has its roots in Jewish culture, it is open to individuals of all ages and cultures.

Skirball Museum

The Skirball Museum predates the Skirball Cultural Center, having been established in 1972 at the Hebrew Union College-Jewish Institute of Religion in L.A.  The museum moved into the Skirball Cultural Center after the center's completion. The Skirball's core exhibition, Visions and Values: Jewish Life from Antiquity to America, traces the history, experiences and values of Jews over 4,000 years. Featuring changing displays of works from the Skirball's museum collection, the exhibition's galleries contain multimedia installations, rare artifacts, historical documents and photographs, works of fine art, interactive computer stations and sound recordings that lead visitors on the Jewish people's journey, culminating with their experiences in the United States.

Comprising more than 30,000 objects, the Skirball's museum collection includes archaeological artifacts from biblical and later historical periods; Jewish ceremonial objects from countries around the world; an extensive group of Old World Jewish objects; the Project Americana collection, comprising objects that document the “everyday life of ordinary people” in the United States since the 1850s; and works of fine art in a variety of media.

Architecture

Designed by Israeli-born architect Moshe Safdie, the campus of the Skirball Cultural Center is in the Santa Monica Mountains near the Sepulveda Pass.

Noah's Ark
The Noah's Ark galleries were designed by Olson Sundberg Kundig Allen Architects of Seattle. Partner Jim Olson was the lead designer of the ark and Principal Alan Maskin designed the interactive exhibits and provided art direction for the project, including the design of nearly 300 animals. Brooklyn-based designer/puppeteer Chris M. Green created additional life-sized animals, many of them puppets to be operated by gallery staff. Outdoors, the Noah's Ark experience includes a rainbow mist installation developed by Moshe Safdie, the architect of the Skirball Cultural Center, in partnership with environmental artist Ned Kahn.

Public programs
The Skirball presents a range of music, theater, poetry, literary, film and other performing arts.

Education

The Skirball annually serves approximately 60,000 schoolchildren and teachers representing virtually every religious and ethnic background in Southern California. The family-oriented discovery center includes a simulated dig site and field tent and informs visitors about the archaeology of ancient Israel and the Near East.

References

Further reading
 Cinema's Legacy at the Skirball, AFI
 Skirball Foundation pledges $2 million for new chair, January 17, 2003
 Lori Starr named Director, Skirball Museum
 About the Skirball
 Philosophy of the Skirball

External links
 Official website of the Skirball Cultural Center

Museums in Los Angeles
Arts centers in California
Art museums and galleries in Los Angeles
Jewish museums in California
Santa Monica Mountains
Sepulveda Boulevard
Jews and Judaism in Los Angeles
Jewish organizations based in the United States
National Performance Network Partners
Organizations established in 1996
Cultural centers in the United States
1996 establishments in California
Brentwood, Los Angeles
Moshe Safdie buildings
Postmodern architecture in California